Clemens Scholten (born 1955), the major contemporary authority on the works of the sixth century Christian Alexandrian philosopher John Philopon, teaches in the Catholic Theology and Philosophy departments of the University of Cologne. Earlier publications were devoted to Nag Hammadi and the Alexandrian Catechetical School. Scholten has also recently edited a work of Theodoret.

Selected publications 

Die alexandrinische Katechetenschule, 1995

Antike Naturphilosopĥie und christliche Kosmologie in der Schrift "De Opificio Mundi" des Johannes Philoponos [Patristische Texte und Studien 45], De Gruyter 1996

Johannes Philoponos, De Opificio Mundi = Uber die Erschaffung der Welt [ Fontes Christiani 23/1,2,3], Brepols 1997

Johannes Philoponos, De Aeternitate Mundi = Uber die Ewigkeit der Welt [ Fontes Christiani 64/1,2,3,4,5], Brepols 2009-2011

Theodoret, De Graecorum Affectione Curatione: Heilung der Griechischen Krankheiten [ Vigiliae Christianae ], Brill 2015

Sources 

JSTOR:41 Related Entries

1955 births
Living people
German historians of philosophy